Denis Simplikevich (born 11 March 1991) is a Russian rugby union footballer. He plays as a centre.

Simplikevich plays for Enisei-STM in Russia, since 2011/12.

He has 27 caps for Russia, since 2011, with 17 tries scored, 85 points on aggregate. Simplikevich was part of the Russian squad at the 2011 Rugby World Cup, playing in two games.
He scored a try against Ireland and another against Australia in the pool games.

In the match for the Russian Supercup 2017 against the RC Kuban, he made 7 tries. This is the record of Russia of all times. Enisei-STM won with a score of 64-20.

Simplikevich three times became the top try scorer of the Russian Championship (2012, 2014, 2017).

In the European Rugby Challenge Cup he has 6 tries in 18 matches.

Honours

 Russian Championships (9): 2011, 2012, 2014, 2016, 2017, 2018, 2019, 2020-21, 2021-22
 Russian Cup (6): 2014, 2016, 2017, 2020, 2021, 2022
 Russian Supercup (3): 2014, 2015, 2017
 European Rugby Continental Shield (2): 2016-17, 2017–18

References

External links
 
 2011 Rugby World Cup Profile
 

1991 births
Living people
People from Novokuznetsk
Russian rugby union players
Russia international rugby union players
Rugby union fullbacks
Universiade gold medalists for Russia
Universiade medalists in rugby sevens
Medalists at the 2013 Summer Universiade
Yenisey-STM Krasnoyarsk players
Sportspeople from Kemerovo Oblast